Victory Liner Inc. (VLI) is one of the largest provincial bus companies operating in the Philippines, servicing routes mainly to the provinces of Central Luzon which includes Zambales, Pampanga, Bulacan and Northern Luzon which includes Benguet, Pangasinan, Bataan, Nueva Vizcaya, Kalinga, Isabela and Cagayan. It was founded in 1945, when Chevy trucks from the United States Army used as their primary transportation fleet, it has grown to become one of the largest bus transportation business groups in the Philippines, servicing all key destinations in Northern and Central Luzon.

Victory Liner deploys more than 900 buses in its daily operations. It is the sister company of Five Star.

Etymology

The phrase "Victory Joe", reminiscent of America's victory in World War II became a household word way back then. As such, Mr. Hernandez decided to coin out the name of his bus firm from it, and so became Victory Liner.

History

Victory Liner's beginnings trace back from the years of Japanese occupation in the country. Jose I. Hernandez, a mechanic from Macabebe, Pampanga, collected bits and pieces of machinery, metals and spare parts from abandoned U.S. Military vehicles intending to build a delivery truck from scratch for his family's buy-and-sell business of rice, corn, vegetables and their home-made laundry soap. Upon completion of the truck, he was surprised to see that what he envisioned to be a delivery truck turned out to be more like a bus.

On October 15, 1945, Mr. Hernandez's first bus plied the Manila-Olongapo-Manila line. He was the driver and Leonardo D. Trinidad (a brother-in-law) was his conductor.

Mr. Hernandez was unaware that that was the start of a very big thing. Later on, the Hernandezes incorporated the business and became one of the main transport modes in the province of Zambales, Quezon and Batangas to ferry passengers and goods to and from Manila and the provinces of Bulacan, Pampanga, Bataan, Zambales, Pangasinan, La Union, Tarlac, Benguet, Nueva Ecija, Nueva Vizcaya, Isabela, Cagayan, Apayao, and Kalinga.

In 2007, Victory Liner introduced deluxe class for its Baguio and Cagayan Valley services.

The Company was passed on to the son of Mr. Jose Hernandez, Johnny Hernandez.

In 2011, Victory Liner initially equipped 50 air-conditioned buses with Sun Broadband Wireless Wi-Fi powered by Sun Cellular to allow passengers with Wi-Fi capable gadgets such as mobile phones, laptops and other wireless gadgets to log on to the Internet making travel more productive and entertaining. Victory Liner will have the most number of buses with free Wi-Fi after Sun equips its whole fleet of air conditioned buses before the end of the year. To date, more than 600 airconditioned buses and are equipped with Wi-Fi technology and still growing.

In April 2012, Victory Liner partnered with AirAsia Philippines, the country's newest low cost airline, to provide free shuttle service for inbound and outbound passengers of Clark International Airport for the convenience of AirAsia passengers and guests.

Fleet 
Victory Liner maintains and operates different buses from various manufacturers.

Current
Santarosa Motor Works

Daewoo BV115 Cityliner
Daewoo BV115 Jetliner
Daewoo BF106 (Non-airconditioned units)
Daewoo BS106 Cityliner
Daewoo BH117H Cityliner
Iveco Euromidi CC150
MAN R39 18.350
MAN A85 18.280 
Nissan Diesel RB46S
Nissan Diesel JA450SSN
Nissan Diesel PKB212N
Nissan Diesel SP215NSB

Zyle Daewoo Corporation

Daewoo FX120 Cruising Star
Daewoo FX212 Super Cruiser 

Higer Bus
 V91 KLQ6119QE3 
 A80 KLQ6123K

Hino Motors
Hino RK8JST
Hino RK8JMT

Hyundai Motor Company
Hyundai Universe Space Classic 
Hyundai Universe Space Comfort
Hyundai Universe Space Luxury (including Powertec variants)
Hyundai Universe Xpress Noble
Hyundai Super Aero City 
Hyundai Unicity

Kia Motors
Kia Granbird Parkway
Kia Granbird Bluesky
Kia Granbird Silkroad 

King Long
King Long XMQ6117Y3 

Almazora Motors
MAN Lion Star 18.310
MAN Tourist Star RE Deluxe R39 18.350 HOCL 
MAN Tourist Star RE Regio 18.350 HOCL
MAN Tourist Star RE Regio RR3 19.360 HOCL

Yutong
Yutong ZK6100H
Yutong ZK6105H
Yutong ZK6107HA 
Yutong ZK6129H
Yutong ZK6122HD9 

Autodelta Coach Builders
Volvo B7R
Volvo B8R 
Volvo B11R
Guilin Daewoo GL6127HKC1

Del Monte Motor Works
DM12 Series 1
DM14 Series 3 (Hino RK8J chassis and Hyundai Aero Space chassis)
Volvo B7R DM16 Series 2
DM18 (MAN RR3 19.360 chassis)
Lion's Star

Former
Hyundai Motor Company
Hyundai Aero Space LS

Isuzu Motors
Isuzu Cubic (1st-generation)

King Long
King Long XMQ6119T
King Long XMQ6126Y

MAN Truck & Bus
MAN 16.290
MAN A55 18.310

Mitsubishi Fuso
Mitsubishi Fuso Aero Bus

UD Nissan Diesel
Nissan Diesel UA
Nissan Diesel Space Arrow

Nissan Diesel Philippines Corporation
 Nissan Diesel Euro Trans JA430SAN
 Nissan Diesel Euro Trans RB46SR

Santarosa Motor Works
Santarosa MAN Exfoh Hi-Deck
Santarosa Nissan Diesel CPB87N

Kassbohrer-Setra
Setra S215

Kia Motors
 Kia Granbird KM948 SD-II
 Kia Granbird HD

Fare classes

Each and every unit of their buses has its own fare classes:
Ordinary fare (3×2 seating)
Regular air conditioned (2×2 seating)
Deluxe (2×2 seating with more leg room, and lavatory on board)
First class (2×1 seating top-rated seats, lavatory on board, free newspaper, snacks, and media on-demand monitors.)

Note: Baguio First Class has stewardess, while Tuguegarao First Class has no stewardess.

Terminals

Metro Manila
Rizal Avenue Extension, Caloocan
EDSA Cubao, Quezon City
EDSA Kamias, Quezon City
EDSA Pasay 
Earnshaw St., Sampaloc, Manila

Provincial

Central Luzon
Pampanga
Apalit Terminal - San Vicente, Apalit, Pampanga
San Fernando City Terminal - Jose Abad Santos Avenue, Dolores, City of San Fernando, Pampanga
Robinson's Starmills Terminal - San Jose, City of San Fernando, Pampanga
Dau Bus Terminal - R9, Dau, Mabalacat City, Pampanga
Bataan
Bataan City Terminal - Ibayo, Balanga City, Bataan
Mariveles Terminal - One Source Gas Station, Roman Superhighway, Mariveles, Bataan
Zambales
Iba Terminal - Palanginan, Iba, Zambales
Olongapo City Terminal - West Bajac-bajac, Olongapo City
Santa Cruz Terminal - Poblacion North, Santa Cruz, Zambales
Nueva Ecija
San Jose - AH26, San Jose, Nueva Ecija

Ilocos Region
Pangasinan
Alaminos Terminal - Quezon Avenue, Poblacion, Alaminos, Pangasinan
Bolinao Terminal - Concordia, Bolinao, Pangasinan
Dagupan Terminal - Perez Boulevard, Herrero-Perez, Dagupan
Lingayen Terminal - Avenida Rizal East, Lingayen, Pangasinan

Cordillera Administrative Region
Baguio
Baguio Terminal - Upper Session Road, Barangay Marcoville, Baguio
Kalinga
Bulanao, Tabuk City, Kalinga
Daguitan Street, Poblacion, Dagupan Weste, Tabuk City, Kalinga

Cagayan Valley
Isabela
Cauayan Terminal - Dy-Seven Gasoline Station, San Fermin, Cauayan, Isabela
Ilagan City Terminal - Guinatan, Ilagan City, Isabela
Roxas Terminal - Bantug, Roxas, Isabela
San Mateo Terminal - Purok 7, Barangay Uno, San Mateo, Isabela
Santiago City Terminal - Calao East, Santiago City, Isabela
Cagayan
Aparri Terminal - United Petron Station 2, Gen. Luna St., Macanaya District, Aparri, Cagayan
Tuao Terminal - Tuao Integrated Bus Terminal, Tuao, Cagayan
Tuguegarao City Terminal - Maharlika Highway, Penge-Ruyu, Tuguegarao City, Cagayan

Destinations

Metro Manila

Monumento, Caloocan 
Cubao, Quezon City 
Kamias, Quezon City 
Divisoria, Manila
EDSA, Pasay
Earnshaw Sampaloc, Manila

Provincial

Calumpit, Bulacan 
Guiguinto, Bulacan 
Malolos City, Bulacan
Apalit, Pampanga
City of San Fernando, Pampanga
Mabalacat, Pampanga (Dau Bus Terminal)
Clark Freeport Zone, Pampanga
San Jose City, Nueva Ecija
Olongapo City, Zambales
Iba, Zambales
Santa Cruz, Zambales 
Tarlac City, Tarlac
Alaminos, Pangasinan
Bolinao, Pangasinan
Dagupan
Rosales, Pangasinan
Dasol, Pangasinan
Lingayen, Pangasinan 
Baguio, Benguet
Roxas, Isabela
Santiago City, Isabela
Ilagan City, Isabela
Cauayan, Isabela
San Mateo, Isabela
Aritao, Nueva Vizcaya
Aparri, Cagayan
Tuao, Cagayan
Tuguegarao City, Cagayan 
Tabuk City, Kalinga

Note: All Regular Buses will pass through SCTEX Concepcion/Luisita Exit, for Tuguegarao-Metro Manila trips they use TPLEX Pura Exit and for First Class Trips, they use TPLEX Rosario Exit.

Inter-Provincial Routes (vice versa)
Olongapo 
Baguio (via Tarlac SCTEX Concepcion Exit)
Balanga
Clark International Airport
Dau via SCTEX
Iba
Sta. Cruz
San Felipe
Dagupan via Sta. Cruz

Sta. Cruz
Alaminos
Baguio
Bolinao
Dagupan
Olongapo

Dagupan
Baguio
Bolinao
Clark International Airport
Roxas
Santiago
Sta. Cruz via Alaminos
Tuguegarao
Olongapo via Sta .Cruz

Baguio
Olongapo (via Tarlac SCTEX Concepcion Exit)
Dagupan via San Fabian/Agoo
Sta. Cruz via Alaminos
Bolinao
Tuguegarao (soon to operate)

Tuguegarao
Balanga
Dagupan
Roxas
Santiago via Ilagan
Baguio (soon to operate)
Mariveles
Clark

Former destinations
Gonzaga, Cagayan
Jones, Isabela
San Carlos City, Pangasinan
Banaue, Ifugao
Santa Ana, Cagayan
Tayug, Pangasinan
Cabanatuan, Nueva Ecija

Subsidiaries
Chona Patrick Bus Liner (Vigan-Laoag-Pudtol)
Sta. Lucia Express Bus Company (Avenida-Candon)
Five Star Bus Company
Bataan Transit
First North Luzon Transit
Luzon Cisco Transport
Bicol Isarog Transport System

Gallery

References

External links
Victory Liner Website

Bus companies of the Philippines
Companies based in Caloocan
Transport companies established in 1945
Philippine companies established in 1945